Greystone Farm is a settlement in Kenya's Central Province.  It has an elevation of 1467 meters above sea level.

References 

Populated places in Central Province (Kenya)